Once Upon A Time There Was A Circus (Había una vez un circo) is a 1972 Argentine musical comedy film directed by Enrique Carreras, written by Carreras and Abel Santacruz, and starring Gaby, Fofó and Miliki from the trio of Spanish clowns Los Payasos de la Tele. It was scored by Tito Ribero.

Plot
A young girl named Andrea falls ill, but really wants to go to a circus. Her father decides to invite circus performers home so that they can make his daughter feel better. The man is a widower and is planning to marry Carla. Andrea doesn't want him to marry her as she knows that the woman is only interested in his money. The girl runs away from home in protest and her father decides not marry. However, she gets kidnapped by Carla's brother who demands a ransom. Three clowns, Gaby, Fofó and Miliki, decide to rescue the girl.

Cast

References

External links
 

1970s children's comedy films
1970s musical comedy films
1972 comedy films
1972 films
Argentine children's films
Argentine musical comedy films
Films scored by Tito Ribero
Films shot in Buenos Aires
Films with screenplays by Abel Santa Cruz
1970s Spanish-language films
Films directed by Enrique Carreras